Xeroplexa belemensis is a species of air-breathing land snail, a terrestrial pulmonate gastropod mollusk in the family Geomitridae.

Distribution
This species occurs in Portugal.

References

External links
 Servain, G. (1880). Etude sur les Mollusques recueillis en Espagne et au Portugal. Saint-Germain: Imprimerie D. Bardin. 172 pp

belemensis
Gastropods described in 1880